Sandip Chakrabarti is an Indian astrophysicist.  He developed a computer model to show how life on earth could have originated in outer space.

Education
He started his education in Lalit Mohan Shyam Mohini High School in Malda. After finishing his Bachelor of Science from Ramakrishna Mission Residential College, Narendrapur  in Physics Honours in 1979 (and becoming topper of Calcutta University) he went to IIT, Kanpur to complete his M.Sc. Degree in Physics in 1981. He joined the Physics Dept. of the University of Chicago in 1981 to complete PhD work. Soon he completed a paper with Robert Geroch and X.B. Liang on a Theorem on "Time like Curves of limited acceleration in General Relativity", and under S. Chandrasekhar's supervision solved the Dirac equation for massive particles with spin in Kerr geometry. 
Subsequently, he concentrated on black hole astrophysics, received his Ph.D. in 1985 and went to Caltech as a R.C. Tolman Fellow. Major work in this period includes finding Natural Angular Momentum distribution of barotropic flow around black holes, nucleosynthesis around black holes.

Career
After a brief period at ICTP, Trieste, where Chakrabarti completed a few definitive work on the formation of shocks in transonic/advective flows around black holes, he joined Tata Institute of Fundamental Research, and S.N. Bose National Centre. Presently he is  the Director of Indian Centre for Space Physics, Kolkata, which he founded in 1999. He was at NASA Goddard Space Flight Centre (1994-1995) as a Senior Associate selected by National Research Council.

Research
The main focus of Chakrabarti's research is the hydrodynamic and radiative properties of astrophysical flows around black holes and other compact objects. He showed that the accreting matter must be transonic and should have standing, oscillating and propagating shocks. He and his collaborators studied many aspects of these flows and showed that the black hole accretion must have non-Keplerian component which plays a major role in deciding the observational properties. He wrote the first monograph on "Theory of Transonic Astrophysical Flows" (World Scientific Pub. Co., Singapore; 1990). He has completed over 650 research articles and written or edited several books and conference volumes. Forty Eight students have completed Ph.D. Thesis under his supervision.

Chakrabarti was the first scientist to suggest that Gamma-ray bursts are the birth cry of black holes at his presentation in 1995, third Hunsville, Alabama Conference. In 2013, Scientists observed a conclusive evidence of this birth cry. He is also the first to suggest (1992-1996) that the accretion disks in an extreme mass ratio binaries could change the gravitational wave signals.

References 

Living people
Indian astrophysicists
20th-century Indian astronomers
University of Calcutta alumni
1958 births
Scientists from Kolkata